The 1826 Red River Flood was a devastating flood that took place along the Red River in Manitoba. The flood was the largest to impact the Winnipeg area (reaching a peak flow 40% above that of the 1997 Red River flood), and was exacerbated by high winds and ice jams. The flooding caused a redistribution of population in the Red River Valley, affected the placement of the Canadian Pacific Railway line, and greatly influenced future disaster planning in the province.

See also
1950 Red River flood

References

History of Winnipeg
Floods in Canada
Natural disasters in Manitoba

Red River floods